Green Bay  is a community in the Canadian province of Nova Scotia, located in the Lunenburg Municipal District in Lunenburg County.

Climate
According to the Köppen climate classification, Green Bay is a humid continental climate
typified by large seasonal temperature differences, with warm to hot (and often humid) summers, and cold (sometimes severely) winters.

Parks
Bush Island Provincial Park
Rissers Beach Provincial Park
Crescent Beach Public/ Private beach
Green Bay Private beaches that are open to the public.

References
Green Bay on Destination Nova Scotia

Communities in Lunenburg County, Nova Scotia
General Service Areas in Nova Scotia